Yangjie Township is a township in Yuanjiang Hani, Yi and Dai Autonomous County, Yunnan, China.

Administrative division
As of 2016, the township is divided into one community and five villages: 
 Yangjie Community
 Guodi
 Bamu
 Dangduo
 Zhixia
 Langzhi

Geography
The township sits at the southern Yuanjiang Hani, Yi and Dai Autonomous County. It borders Lijiang Subdistrict in the northeast, Nanuo Township in the south, and Yinyuan Town in the west.

The highest point is Mount Aboli, elevation .

There are five major rivers and streams in the township, namely the Qingshui Rivers, Gezhi River, Nanman River, Kunjiu River, and Kunhao River.

Economy
The region's economy is based on agriculture. Tea, sugarcane, tobacco are the economic plants of this region. The region abounds with rubies.

Transportation
The township is connected to two highways: the National Highway G553 and the Yuanjiang–Manhao Expressway.

References

Bibliography

Divisions of Yuanjiang Hani, Yi and Dai Autonomous County